Michel Sorin (born 18 September 1961 in Cossé-le-Vivien) is a French football manager and former player who is currently an assistant manager of Olympique Lyonnais Féminin. He managed the Benin national football team and—from 2011 to 2019—was the head coach of AS Vitré.

Personal 
His older son Arthur Sorin is currently playing as a defender in the Danish Superliga for AGF Aarhus, while his younger son Eliott Sorin is currently playing for the reserve team at Swedish Helsingborgs IF. Both his sons started their youth career at Stade Rennais, where their father used to play.

References

External links

Living people
1961 births
French footballers
Stade Lavallois players
Stade Rennais F.C. players
Stade Brestois 29 players
Ligue 1 players
Ligue 2 players
French expatriate footballers
Requins de l'Atlantique FC managers
Benin national football team managers
Association football defenders
Sportspeople from Mayenne
French football managers
Footballers from Pays de la Loire